The Tirgan Festival (Persian: جشنواره تیرگان) is a biennial four-day celebration of Iranian arts and culture held in Toronto, Ontario, Canada. The Festival celebrates Iranian arts and culture through an array of artistic and literary disciplines including music, dance, cinema, theatre, history, literature and visual arts. The festivals are held in multiple locations in Toronto, such as the Harbourfront Centre, the Distillery District, and St. Lawrence Center for the Arts. Tirgan Festival 2019 accommodated over 250 artists, 140 performances, and professional speakers.

History 
Originally showcased under the name, Under the Azure Dome, Tirgan 2006 celebrated Nowruz (the Persian New Year) as well as Iranian arts and culture on a mass scale. The festival was held between March 17 and March 19, 2006 at Toronto's Harbourfront Centre and featured over one hundred performers in dance, music, theatre, cinema, and visual arts. It drew 25,000 visitors from all over the world. In 2008, Tirgan featured internationally acclaimed artists including Ostad Mohammad Reza Lotfi, Saeed Shanbehzadeh, and Shahrokh Moshkin-Ghalam. Tirgan 2008 attracted over 60,000 visitors to more than 50 performances. With more than 70 performances by over 150 artists from around the globe, organized by over 300 volunteers, Tirgan 2011 attracted 120,000 visitors to become the world's largest Iranian festival. Tirgan 2015 included over 200 artists, performing for an audience of 150,000. Tirgan 2017 will include over 100 performances and is expected to attract over 160,000 visitors.

The Legend of Tirgan 
Tirgan refers to an ancient Iranian festival. There are various legends concerning its origins. One legend describes how Iran and Turan, two long-standing enemies, decided to declare peace by drawing the boundaries between the two empires. Arash, the best archer in the Iranian army, was chosen to ascend Mount Damavand to shoot an arrow, with the landing location determining the boundary. Iranians watched in hope as the arrow flew from dawn until noon, expanding the boundaries of Iran beyond all expectations. What resulted was the inclusion of many diverse cultures throughout the territory of Iran. Tirgan became a celebration of that diversity.

Highlights 
Tirgan Festival promotes Iranian arts and culture while making a concerted effort to feature contributions from Iranians of all ethnicities, backgrounds, and cultural disciplines. At Tirgan festivals, local as well as internationally renowned artists and performers unite to celebrate Iranian culture and heritage. Visitors to Tirgan can also sample savoury Iranian cuisine. It is also an opportunity to visit a traditional a tea house and a bazaar showcasing goods that include arts and crafts, Persian literature, exotic sweets, spices, and traditional musical instruments.

Organization 
The Tirgan Festival is organized by the Iranian-Canadian Centre for Art and Culture, a non-profit, non-partisan, and non-religious organization, registered under the Ontario Corporation Act, in Ontario, Canada.

Funding & Support 
Tirgan relies primarily on donations from the community, grants from the federal, provincial, and municipal tiers of the Canadian Government, and corporate sponsorships. Other funding sources are from booth rentals, gift shop sales and ticket sales (however, over 90% of the performances and events are free of charge). Local non-profit foundations, student associations, community and professional groups and artistic groups help promote and raise awareness of the festival through Tirgan's Affiliate marketing initiatives. Additionally, 300 volunteers work on the festival each year.

Under the Azure Dome 2006 
“Under the Azure Dome” celebrated Nowruz and explored Iranian art and culture on a scale not previously experienced in Canada. The festival was held March 17 to 19, 2006 at the Harbourfront Centre and presented over a hundred performers in dance, music, theatre, cinema, and visual arts, drawing an unprecedented number of about 25,000 visitors from Canada and overseas.

Tirgan 2008: ‘Exploring Diversity’ 
The second Tirgan Festival was held July 17 to 20, 2008. The theme of the festival was “Exploring Diversity” and it included more than 100 artists in 40 performances. It was attended by over 60,000 visitors.

Tirgan 2011: 'Visions of Eternity' 
Tirgan's third biennial festival took place from Thursday July 21, 2011 to Sunday July 24, 2011. With a theme of "Visions of Eternity", the festival attracted 120,000 visitors to more than 70 performances by over 150 artists. Over 300 volunteers helped Tirgan become the world's largest Iranian festival. Tirgan 2011 also coincided with the release of the festival's new brand and logo, as well as the introduction of its film and short story contest series.

The 2011 festival highlights included performances by Nima Kiann's Les Ballets Persans, the folk musical group Shanbehzadeh Ensemble, contemporary dance by Ida Saki, Iranian rock bands King Raam and Radio Tehran.
Other key programs included a literary program with authors such as Shahrnush Parsipur, and the Visual Arts exhibition Visions of Eternity which included the works of Reza Derakhshani, Nasser Ovissi, Parastou Forouhar, and Abbas Akhavan amongst others.

Tirgan 2013: 'Hope' 
From July 18 to 21, 2013, Tirgan held its fourth festival in Toronto. Tirgan 2013 attracted over 120,000 visitors and brought together artists from around the globe to showcase the richness and diversity of Iranian art and culture. The festival featured more than 70 performances in traditional, contemporary, and transitional arts.

The programs are divided into six sections: Dance, Cinema, Literature, Music, Theatre, and Visual Arts. Designed to include a variety of forms and styles these programs incorporate a blend of workshops, panel discussions, lectures, tours, interactive installations and exhibitions to engage, educate and entertain. Some highlights of the 2013 festival included:  Vancouver Pars National Ballet, screening of film by Shirin Neshat, live musical performance by UK based Ajam (band), classical and folk music ensemble Sarv, and The Third Space visual arts exhibition curated by Sanaz Mazinani.

Tirgan 2015: ‘Homeland’ 
Tirgan Festival returned to Toronto's Harbourfront Centre from August 20 to 23, 2015, bringing together over 200 artists from around the globe to showcase the richness and diversity of Iranian art and culture through their mosaic of world-class talents. The theme for Tirgan 2015 was Homeland and it attracted over 150,000 visitors.

Tirgan 2017: ‘Benevolence’ 
Tirgan 2017 was held at Toronto's Harbourfront Centre from Thursday July 27 to Sunday July 30, 2017, with the theme of “Benevolence”. The festival included over 200 performances and was attended by over 150,000 visitors.

References

External links
 Official Tirgan Website
 Toronto Festivals and Events Calendar – Tirgan 2011
 BBC Persian – "ﺟﺸﻨﻮارﻩ ﺗﻴﺮﮔﺎن در ﺗﻮرﻧﺘﻮ:"ﻳﮑﯽ ﺑﻮد ﻳﮑﯽ ﻧﺒﻮد
 Toronto Star – Bringing Iran to Toronto

Festivals in Toronto
Iranian-Canadian culture
Iranian-Canadian organizations